Thomas "Tom" Coop (10 March 1863 – 16 April 1929) was an English rugby union, and professional rugby league footballer who played in the 1890s. He played representative level rugby union (RU) for England, and at club level for Leigh (Heritage № 1), as a fullback, i.e. number 15, and representative level rugby League (RL) for Lancashire, and at club level for Leigh (Heritage № 1), as goal-kicking , i.e. number 1. Prior to Thursday 29 August 1895, Leigh was a rugby union club.

Background
Tom Coop was born in Tottington, Lancashire, England, and he died aged 66 in Bucklow, Cheshire, England.

Playing career

International honours
Tom Coop won a cap for England (RU) while at Leigh in the 1892 Home Nations Championship against Scotland.

County honours
Tom Coop won caps for Lancashire (RL) while at Leigh.

Change of Code
When Leigh converted from the rugby union code to the rugby league code on Thursday 29 August 1895, Tom Coop would have been 32 years of age. Consequently, he was both a rugby union, and rugby league footballer for Leigh, and he played his last match for Leigh in the 8-11 defeat by Stockport at Mather Lane (adjacent to the Bridgewater Canal), Leigh, on Saturday 4 December 1897.

References

External links
Search for "Thomas Coop" at britishnewspaperarchive.co.uk
Search for "Tom Coop" at britishnewspaperarchive.co.uk

1863 births
1929 deaths
England international rugby union players
English rugby league players
English rugby union players
Lancashire rugby league team players
Leigh Leopards players
Rugby league fullbacks
Rugby league players from Bury, Greater Manchester
Rugby union fullbacks
Rugby union players from Bury, Greater Manchester
People from Tottington, Greater Manchester